Dizabad may refer to:
Dizabad, Markazi
Dizabad, Mazandaran

See also
Dizbad (disambiguation)